Canada participated in the 2019 Parapan American Games in Lima, Peru from 23 August to 1 September, 2019.

Medalists

Athletics

Men's track

Men's field

Women's track

Women's field

Badminton

Canada have secured seven quotas in badminton.

Men

Women

Mixed doubles

Boccia

Canada have secured seven quotas in boccia.

Cycling

Road
Men

Women

Track
Men

Women

Goalball

Judo

Two judoka have secured quotas.
Men

Women

Swimming

Men

Women

Table tennis

Men

Women

Taekwondo

One Canadian taekwondo athlete is to participate.

Volleyball

Canada's women's sitting volleyball team are ranked world number sixteen.

Men's team roster
 Doug Learoyd (captain)
 Chris Bird
 Matteo Lisoway
 Jesse Buckingham
 Austin Hinchey
 Jesse Ward
 Bryce Foster
 Mikael Bartholdy
 Jamoi Anderson
 Darek Symonowicz
 Brad Hunter
 Jeff Smith (Head coach)

Women's team roster
Canada's women's sitting volleyball team are ranked world number six.
 Danielle Ellis (captain)
 Heidi Peters
 Sarah Melenka
 Julie Kozun
 Anne Fergusson
 Jolan Wong
 Felicia Voss-Shafiq
 Katelyn Wright
 Jennifer Oakes
 Angelena Dolezar
 Amber Skyrpan
 Payden Olsen
 Nicole Ban (head coach)

Results

Wheelchair basketball

Wheelchair rugby

Team roster
The mixed team was composed of 1 female and 10 male athletes.
 Travis Brooks Murao
 Michael Whitehead
 Cody Robert Caldwell
 Trevor James Hirschfield (captain)
 Patrice Dagenais (captain)
 Patrice Simard
 Benjamin John Perkins
 Mélanie Labelle
 Shayne Smith
 Zachary David Madell
 Eric Furtado Rodrigues
 Patrick Côté (Head coach)
 David James Willsie (Assistant coach)

Results

See also
Canada at the 2019 Pan American Games

References

2019 in Canadian sports
Canada at the Pan American Games
Nations at the 2019 Parapan American Games